Qhispi Rumiyuq (Quechua qhispi rumi, obsidian (qhispi, q'ispi, qispi glass, transparent body, rumi stone, literally glass stone or transparent stone, -yuq a suffix to indicate ownership, "the one with obsidian", Hispanicized spelling Esperumiyoc) is a mountain in the Cusco Region in Peru, about  high. It is situated in the Urubamba Province, Ollantaytambo District, northeast of Ollantaytambo.

References 

Mountains of Peru
Mountains of Cusco Region